Guy Barker is a Quapaw-American politician and attorney who served one term as the secretary-treasurer of the Quapaw Nation between 2020 and 2022. During the 2022 United States House of Representatives elections in Oklahoma, Barker ran for retiring Congressman Markwayne Mullin's seat in Oklahoma's 2nd congressional district, placing 5th in the 14 candidate Republican primary.

Early life
Barker is an eighth-generation Oklahoman. He earned a Bachelor of Science degree in biosystems and mechanical engineering from Oklahoma State University–Stillwater and a Juris Doctor from the Oklahoma City University School of Law.

Career

2020 election and Secretary-Treasurer of Quapaw Nation
Prior to running for office, Barker worked as a petroleum engineer and attorney.
Barker ran for Quapaw Nation secretary-treasurer in 2020 and was elected to his first term, defeating incumbent Tamara Smiley-Reeves. He campaigned for election with his cousin, Joseph Tali Byrd, who was elected chairman of the tribe in the same election. Barker came into office after a forensic audit of the Tribe resulted in the indictment of former Quapaw Nation Chairman John Berrey and former Quapaw Nation Secretary-Treasurer Tamara Smiley Reeves for mishandling $7 million.

While in office Barker pursued a settlement of the Quapaw Nation's claim for damages against the United States for damage done to Tar Creek (referred to as the "Bear Settlement" by the Quapaw Nation). He also oversaw the increase in the tribe's Saracen Casino Resort credit rating by Moody’s Investors Service and S&P Global Ratings and oversaw the reinvestment in the tribes criminal justice system after the reestablishment of the Quapaw reservation in a follow-up case to the McGirt v. Oklahoma decision. He was named "Tribal Executive of the Year" in 2021.

2022 congressional campaign

Barker ran for Oklahoma's 2nd congressional district in 2022 after incumbent Markwayne Mullin announced his retirement to run for the open U.S. Senate seat. He placed fifth and failed to qualify for the runoff.

2022 Quapaw elections
Barker ran for reelection in the 2022 Quapaw Nation elections, facing challenger Kathryn "Wena" Supernaw. Supernaw defeated Barker in the July election.

Electoral history

References

21st-century American politicians
21st-century Native American politicians
Candidates in the 2022 United States House of Representatives elections
Living people
Native American men in politics
Oklahoma Republicans
Quapaw Nation politicians
Year of birth missing (living people)